The 2006–07 Armenian Hockey League season was the sixth season of the Armenian Hockey League, the top level of ice hockey in Armenia. Five teams participated in the league, and Urartu Yerevan won the championship.

Regular season

Final
Urartu Yerevan - HC Shengavit Yerevan (3-0, 4-2)

External links
 Season on hockeyarchives.ru

Armenian Hockey League
2006 in Armenian sport
2007 in Armenian sport
Armenian Hockey League seasons